Robert W. Harer is a former member of the Wisconsin State Assembly.

Biography
Harer was born on August 15, 1941 in Baldwin, Wisconsin. He is married with four children.

Career
Harer was first elected to the Assembly in 1978. Additionally, he was a member of the Baldwin-Woodville District School Board from 1972 to 1978. He is a Republican.

References

People from Baldwin, Wisconsin
Republican Party members of the Wisconsin State Assembly
School board members in Wisconsin
1941 births
Living people